Frank Halloran (13 December 1912 – 1 July 1966) was an Australian rules footballer who played with Melbourne and Footscray in the Victorian Football League (VFL).

Halloran played in just two VFL seasons. He started and finished his career at Kyneton and in 1938 was awarded the Bendigo Football League's best and fairest award, the Fred Wood Medal.

His son Danny also played in the VFL, for Carlton in the 1970s.

References

1912 births
Australian rules footballers from Victoria (Australia)
Melbourne Football Club players
Western Bulldogs players
Kyneton Football Club players
1966 deaths
Place of birth missing
Place of death missing